Ipswich is the central suburb and central business district of Ipswich in the City of Ipswich, Queensland, Australia. It is also known as Ipswich CBD (central business district).

Geography 
The suburb is situated on the Bremer River.

The suburb of Ipswich has a number of distinct areas. The Ipswich central business district is in the north with the Bremer River forming the northern boundary. Limestone Hill and its parklands are to the east. Denmark Hill with its exclusive residential area and conservation park is to the west. A mixture of health, educations and residential areas make up the south.

The Ipswich CBD is centred on Brisbane and Limestone Streets, and the Ipswich Mall, and includes major supermarkets and chain stores, specialties stores and the many government agencies. Most street parking is controlled by parking meters in business hours.

History 
In 1860 a Baptist Church opened in Ipswich. On Monday 11 December 1876 a foundation stone was laid for a new  Baptist church building, which opened about 19 June 1877.

Ipswich Girls Grammar School opened on 1 February 1892.

Heritage listings

Ipswich has a number of heritage-listed sites, including:
 5 Brisbane Street: Queensland Country Women's Association Girls' Hostel
 25 Brisbane Street: Ulster Hotel
 89 Brisbane Street: Queensland National Bank
 93 Brisbane Street: William Johnston's Shops
 116 Brisbane Street: Old Ipswich Town Hall
 116A Brisbane Street: former Bank of Australasia
 124 Brisbane Street: St Pauls Anglican Church
 169-175 Brisbane Street: Bostock Chambers
 188 Brisbane Street: Baptist Church
 231 Brisbane Street: Flour Mill
 253 Brisbane Street: Hotel Metropole
 68 Chermside Road: St Michaels Nursing Home
 82 Chermside Road: Ipswich Girls' Grammar School Buildings
 82 Chermside Road: Lime Kiln Remains
 48 d'Arcy Doyle Place (formerly Nicholas Street): St Paul's Young Men's Club
 Ellenborough Street: Ipswich Central Mission
 Ellenborough Street: Railway Signal Cabin and Turntable
 45 East Street: Ipswich & West Moreton Building Society building
 59 East Street: Old Ipswich Courthouse
 86 East Street: Uniting Church Central Memorial Hall
 1 Ginn Street: Ginn Cottage
 14 Gray Street: Ipswich Club House
 Limestone Street: Liberty Hall
 22 Limestone Street: St Stephen's Church
 88 Limestone Street: Ipswich Technical College
 103 Limestone Street: Penrhyn
 109 Limestone Street: Colthup's House
 7 Macalister Street: To-Me-Ree
 Milford Street: Queens Park
 1A Milford Street: Claremont
 10A Milford Street: Walter Burley Griffin Incinerator
 11 Murphy Street: Brickstone
 63 Nicholas Street: Soldiers' Memorial Hall
 3 Parker Avenue: Ipswich Mental Hospital (Challinor Centre)
 21 Quarry Street: Central Congregational Church Manse
 30 Quarry Street: Toronto (formerly known as Devonshire Cottage)
 43 Quarry Street: Gooloowan
 Rockton Street: Rockton
 20 Roderick Street: Keiraville
 66 Roderick Street: Ozanam House

Transport

Local transport
There are three forms of public train transport servicing the Ipswich region.

 Queensland Rail City network offers regular services to and from Ipswich railway station to Brisbane, Brisbane Airport, the eastern suburbs, and western suburbs (as far as Rosewood).
Westside Buslines is the prominent bus company in Ipswich, linking all sides of town to Ipswich CBD; Redbank; Springfield; or Forest Lake (in Brisbane).
Southern Cross Citilink is a bus which operates between Ipswich and Indooroopilly via Riverlink, Karalee, Chuwar, Karana Downs, Anstead, and Kenmore.
 Queensland Rail buses offer direct daily services to Gatton, Helidon, Fernvale, Lowood, Coominya, Esk, and Toogoolawah.
An Airport Express Bus operates from Ipswich to Brisbane Airport on a regular basis.

Ipswich also has direct access to the Ipswich Motorway (linking to Brisbane); the Cunningham Highway (linking to Warwick); the Warrego Highway (linking to Toowoomba); and the Centenary Highway (linking Springfield and the Ripley Valley to Brisbane).

Long distance transport
 The Westlander train pasts through Ipswich Station twice a week to Toowoomba and Charleville.
 Greyhound Australia (coaches) offer daily direct services to Toowoomba, Mount Isa, Charleville and Sydney from the Ipswich Transit Centre.
Crisps Coaches offer daily direct services to and from Warwick, Queensland and Stanthorpe.

Education
Ipswich Central State School is a government primary (Early Childhood-6) school for boys and girls at Griffith Road. In 2017, the school had an enrolment of 708 students with 54 teachers (50 full-time equivalent) and 43 non-teaching staff (28 full-time equivalent). It includes a special education program.

Ipswich Special School is a special primary and secondary (Early Childhood-12) school for boys and girls at 2a Milford Street. In 2017, the school had an enrolment of 116 students with 51 teachers (41 full-time equivalent) and 67 non-teaching staff (39 full-time equivalent).

Bremer State High School is a government secondary (7-12) school for boys and girls at 133-153 Warwick Road. In 2017, the school had an enrolment of 1867 students with 146 teachers (143 full-time equivalent) and 83 non-teaching staff (61 full-time equivalent).

Ipswich Flexible Learning Centre is a Catholic secondary (7-12) school for boys and girls at Cnr Queen Victoria Parade & Milford Place. In 2017, the school had an enrolment of 121 students with 13 teachers (9 full-time equivalent) and 13 non-teaching staff (9 full-time equivalent).

Ipswich Girls' Grammar School is a private primary and secondary (Prep-12) school for boys and girls at Cnr Queen Victoria Parade & Chermside Road. In 2017, the school had an enrolment of 852 students with  73 teachers (69 full-time equivalent) and 126 non-teaching staff (53 full-time equivalent).

The University of Southern Queensland has a campus at  Ipswich Campus. It was formerly the Ipswich Campus of the University of Queensland and the Ipswich Mental Hospital (Challinor Centre).

Libraries 
The Ipswich Council operates the Ipswich Central Library at 40 South Street. It opened in 1994 and had a major refurbishment in 2017.

Health
 Ipswich Hospital Chelmsford Avenue
St Andrews Private Hospital, Roderick Street

Many GPs and specialists can be found in Brisbane and Limestone Street, and near both hospitals.

Parks and sports facilities
 Queens Park
 Limestone Park (AFL, running track, velodrome, netball)
 Sandy Gallop Golf Course
 BMX track
 Denmark Hill Conservation Park
 Ipswich Show Ground (including indoor sports centre)

Places of worship

 St Mary's Catholic Church, Elizabeth Street
 St Paul's Anglican Church, Brisbane Street
 Calvary Baptist Church, Chermside Street
 Uniting Church, Ellenborough Street
 Church of Jesus Christ of Latter Day Saints, cnr Hunter and Haig Streets
 The Salvation Army, South Street
 Jehovah's Witnesses, Salisbury Street
 St John's Lutheran Church, Roderick Street
 Centro Church, Pring Street

References

External links 

 

Suburbs of Ipswich, Queensland
Central business districts in Australia